Dwight Vinson McDonald (born May 24, 1951) is a former American football wide receiver in the National Football League. He played for the San Diego Chargers from 1975 to 1978. He played college football at U.S. International University and San Diego State.

References

1951 births
Living people
Players of American football from Texas
American football wide receivers
United States International Gulls football players
San Diego State Aztecs football players
San Diego Chargers players
People from Nixon, Texas
Kearny High School (California) alumni